Michel Koch (born 15 October 1991) is a German former track and road racing cyclist. Both his grandfather, Wolfgang Koch as well as his parents Christian Koch and Petra Koch, born Stegherr (Mettmann), were successful cyclists.

Major results

2009
 1st  Time trial, National Junior Road Championships
 1st  Team pursuit, National Junior Track Championships
 1st Stage 2 La Coupe du Président de la Ville de Grudziadz
 5th Overall Internationale Niedersachsen-Rundfahrt
 6th Overall Driedaagse van Axel
 7th Time trial, UCI Juniors World Championships
 9th Road race, UEC European Junior Road Championships
2010
 National Under-23 Road Championships
2nd Road race
2nd Time trial
 5th Overall Thüringen Rundfahrt der U23
 10th Overall Troféu Joaquim Agostinho
2011
 6th Time trial, UEC European Under-23 Road Championships
 7th Overall Ronde de l'Isard
2012
 National Track Championships
1st  Team pursuit
3rd Individual pursuit
 1st Overall Bundesliga
 2nd Ingolstädter Straßenpreis
 3rd Road race, National Under-23 Road Championships
 3rd Cottbus–Görlitz–Cottbus
 6th Eschborn-Frankfurt City Loop U23
 8th Overall Tour de Berlin
2014
 Volta a Catalunya
1st  Sprints classification
1st  Special sprints classification
 9th Münsterland Giro

References

External links

1991 births
Living people
German male cyclists
Sportspeople from Wuppertal
Cyclists from North Rhine-Westphalia